= Two track =

Two track may refer to:

- Trail
- Double track in rail transport
- A method of multitrack recording using only two audio channels
